Flat Top is an unincorporated community in Dickenson County, Virginia, in the United States.

History
Flat Top was so named from the presence of a flat pasture where cattle would graze.

References

Unincorporated communities in Dickenson County, Virginia
Unincorporated communities in Virginia